Boneh-ye Sukhteh (also Romanized as Boneh-ye Sūkhteh; also known as Sookhteh) is a village in Howmeh-ye Gharbi Rural District, in the Central District of Ramhormoz County, Khuzestan Province, Iran. At the 2006 census, its population was 261, in 58 families.

References 

Populated places in Ramhormoz County